Nabiha Lotfy (January 28, 1937 – June 17, 2015) was a Lebanese-born actor and film director.

She was born in Sidon and attended the American University of Beirut before moving  to Cairo. There, she attended the Cairo Higher Institute of Cinema, graduating in 1964. She helped establish the Association of Egyptian Women Filmmakers in 1990.

She produced more than a dozen documentaries and almost 50 feature films.

Latfy was named to the National Order of the Cedar in 2006.

She died in a hospital in Cairo after an illness of several months.

Selected filmography 
 Aal Yaal
 Prayer in Old Cairo (1971)
 Mohammad Ali Street (1989)
 Karioka

References

External links 
 

1937 births
2015 deaths
Egyptian women film directors
Lebanese film actresses
Recipients of the National Order of the Cedar
American University of Beirut alumni
People from Sidon
Cairo Higher Institute of Cinema alumni